Vehanen is a Finnish surname. Notable people with the surname include:

Kosti Vehanen (1887–1957), Finnish pianist and composer
Petri Vehanen (born 1977), Finnish ice hockey player

Finnish-language surnames